The Chairman of the National Assembly of Vietnam, known as Chairman of the Standing Committee of the National Assembly of Vietnam from 1946 to 1981, is the legislative speaker of Vietnam, presiding over the National Assembly. The National Assembly is, in the words of the constitution, "the highest representative organ of the people; the highest organ of state power".

The chairman is elected by the deputies (members) of the National Assembly in the first season of the assembly's tenure. The Standing Committee, over which the chairman presides, is a permanent body which controls the activities of the National Assembly when it is not in session. The chairman and the other members of the Standing Committee have to resign from their posts when the National Assembly dissolves itself, which it normally does every fifth year. The chairman presides over the sessions of the National Assembly and authenticates laws and resolutions passed by the National Assembly by signing them. The chairman leads the activities of the Standing Committee and organises its external relations with other state bodies and is responsible for maintaining cordial relations between the members of the Standing Committee. The deputies of the National Assembly have the right to question the chairman.

The powers and prestige of the office of chairman has varied throughout the years. For instance, the two first officeholders Nguyễn Văn Tố and Bùi Bằng Đoàn were not members of the Communist Party, while Trường Chinh, the fourth chairman, was ranked second in the Politburo hierarchy. Still, of the ten people who have chaired the National Assembly, five of them have been members of the Politburo. The current chairman is Vương Đình Huệ, and he is ranked third in the Politburo hierarchy.

History
The first chairman of the Standing Committee of the National Assembly was the scholar Nguyễn Văn Tố; he was not a member of the Communist Party. On 3 March 1946, under the chairmanship of Nguyễn Văn Tố, the National Assembly formed the first government of the Democratic Republic of Vietnam. Nguyễn Văn Tố was succeeded in office on 9 November 1946 by Bùi Bằng Đoàn, a poet and another non-Communist Party member. While he was never a member of the Communist Party, he was a committed revolutionary. Tôn Đức Thắng succeeded Bùi Bằng Đoàn as chairman in 1955, and was the first chairman to be a member of the Communist Party. Trường Chinh became the fourth and longest-serving chairman of the National Assembly in Vietnamese history, holding the post from 1960 to 1981, when he became chairman of the State Council, a newly established post. Nguyễn Hữu Thọ, a Southerner, succeeded Trường in 1981, as chairman, but he was not a member of the Politburo. Nguyễn Hữu Thọ stepped down as chairman in 1987, and was succeeded by Lê Quang Đạo, another non-Politburo member. As with Nguyễn Hữu Thọ, Lê Quang Đạo's tenure lasted one term. Nông Đức Mạnh was elected chairman in 1992, and held office until 2001 Nông was the first chairman who came from a minority background, the Tày, and was the first chairman since Trường who was a Politburo member. Nông stepped down in 2001, and was succeeded by Nguyễn Văn An, who served as chairman from 2001 until 2006. On 26 June 2006 Nguyễn Phú Trọng was elected chairman with a majority of 84.58% of the National Assembly deputies in favour. Nguyễn Phú Trọng stepped down in 2011 because of his election to the post of General Secretary of the Central Committee of the Communist Party of Vietnam, and was succeeded by Nguyễn Sinh Hùng. Nguyễn Sinh Hùng stepped down on 31 March 2016, and was replaced by Nguyễn Thị Kim Ngân. She's the first woman to hold the office. Nguyễn Thị Kim Ngân stepped down on 31 March 2021, and was replaced by Vương Đình Huệ.

List

Notes
1. The Politburo of the Central Committee is the highest decision-making body of the CPV and the Central Government. The membership composition, and the order of rank of the individual Politburo members is decided in an election within the newly formed Central Committee in the aftermath of a Party Congress. The Central Committee can overrule the Politburo, but that does not happen often.
2. These numbers are not official.
3. The Central Committee when it convenes for its first session after being elected by a National Party Congress elects the Politburo. According to David Koh, in interviews with several high-standing Vietnamese officials, the Politburo ranking is based upon the number of approval votes by the Central Committee. Lê Hồng Anh, the Minister of Public Security, was ranked 2nd in the 10th Politburo because he received the second-highest number of approval votes. Another example being Tô Huy Rứa of the 10th Politburo, he was ranked lowest because he received the lowest approval vote of the 10th Central Committee when he stood for election for a seat in the Politburo. This system was implemented at the 1st plenum of the 10th Central Committee. The Politburo ranking functioned as an official order of precedence before the 10th Party Congress, and some believe it still does.
4. Ton Duc Thang took over the vacant position of Bui Bang Doan as he was severely ill at that time, however Bui Bang Doan still held the title of Head of National Assembly until he died in 1955, hence Ton Duc Thang was acting Head of National Assembly during that period

References
General
The number of chairmen of the National Assembly, their names, and when they took and left office, was taken from this source:
  
Specific

Bibliography

 
 
 
  
 
 

Politics of Vietnam
Vietnam, National Assembly

1946 establishments in Vietnam